Velká cesta  is a 1963 Czechoslovak and Soviet film. The film starred Josef Kemr.

Cast 
 Josef Abrhám
 Rudolf Hrušínský
 Karel Effa

References

External links
 

1963 films
Czechoslovak drama films
1960s Czech-language films
Czech drama films
1960s Czech films
Soviet drama films